NatureSweet LTD is a San Antonio-based grower, packager and seller of produce. The company grows a variety of tomatoes that includes Glorys, Cherubs, SunBursts, Jubilees and Eclipses. The company is vertically integrated. NatureSweet grows its tomatoes in greenhouses in Willcox, Arizona and 6 Factories in 3 states of Central Mexico, Jalisco, Nayarit and Colima.

History
NatureSweet was founded in Devine, Texas, in 1990 under the name Desert Glory LTD. The company began selling its tomatoes nationwide in 2012. In 2013, NatureSweet purchased the assets of the greenhouse grower, EuroFresh Farms. The company partnered with Ganfer, one of the largest greenhouse vegetable growers in North America in 2016, to increase production. In 2017, it was reported that the company's Cherubs tomatoes were the number one small tomato in the United States.

Certifications
NatureSweet's tomatoes are verified as a non-GMO product by The Non-GMO Project and all of its facilities are Level 3 SQF certified.

References

Companies based in San Antonio